"Dance All Over Me" is a song by British singer-songwriter George Ezra. It was released on 30 September 2022, as the third single from Ezra's third studio album Gold Rush Kid. The song peaked at number 61 on the UK Singles Chart.

Music video
The music video premiered on 30 September 2022. It was directed by Charlie Sarsfield.

Track listings

Charts

Release history

References

2022 singles
2022 songs
Columbia Records singles
George Ezra songs
Songs written by George Ezra